A royal household or imperial household  is the residence and administrative headquarters in ancient and post-classical monarchies, and papal household for popes, and formed the basis for the general government of the country as well as providing for the needs of the sovereign and their relations. It was the core of the royal court, though this included many courtiers who were not directly employed by the monarch as part of the household.

There were often large numbers of employees in the household, strictly differentiated by rank, from nobles with highly sought-after positions that gave close access to the monarch, to all the usual of servants such as cooks, footmen, and maids. The households typically included military forces providing security.  Specialists such as artists, clock-makers and poets might be given a place in the household, often by appointing them as valet de chambre or the local equivalent.

Among many of these households there are certain great offices which have become, in course of time, merely hereditary. In most cases, as the name of the office would suggest, they were held by those who discharged personal functions about the sovereign. Gradually, in ways or for reasons which might vary in each individual case, the office alone survived, the duties either ceasing to be necessary or being transferred to officers of less exalted station.

In the modern period, royal households have evolved into entities which are variously differentiated from national governments. Most modern households have become merely titular.

Europe
The royal households of such of European monarchies have a continuous history since medieval times.

Francia

France

Germany  
1. Supreme Officers of the Court (Oberste Hofchargen) - honorary functions
1.1. The Grand Chamberlain (Oberst-Kämmerer)
1.2. The Grand Cup-Bearer (Oberst-Schenk)
1.3. The Grand Steward (Oberst-Truchseß)
1.4. The Grand Marshal (Oberst-Marschall)
1.5. The Grand Master of the Hunt (Oberst-Jägermeister)
2. Chief Officers of the Household (Oberhofchargen)
2.0. The Premier Marshal of the Household (Oberhof- und Hausmarschall, i. e. chief executive officer of the court)
2.1. The Premier Master of Ceremonies (Ober-Zeremonienmeister)
2.2. The Premier Master of the Robes (Ober-Gewandkämmerer)
2.3. The Premier Cellarer (Ober-Mundschenk)
2.4. The Premier Master of the Horses and Mews (Ober-Stallmeister)
2.5. The Premier Master of the Hunt (Ober-Jägermeister)
2.6. The Premier Captain of the Palace Guard (Ober-Schloßhauptmann)
2.7. The Premier Master of the Kitchen (Ober-Küchenmeister)
2.8. The Superintendent general of the Theaters (Generalintendant der Schauspiele)

Mannheim (Electors Palatinate) 
 The Grand Master of the Household (Obristhofmeister)
 Stewards (Truchsesse)
 The Master of the Music (Hofkapellmeister)
 The Scientist of the Court (Librarian, Masters of the Collections)
 The Artists of the Court
 The medical staff
 The Grand Chamberlain (Obristkämmerer)
 Court's Chamberlains (Hofkämmerer)
 Life Offices
 The Grand Marshal of the Household (Obristhofmarschall)
 The Master of the Larder
 The Master of the Cellar
 The Master of the Tablecloth
 The Master of the Silver and China
 The Master of Kitchen
 The Master of the Pastry
 The Grand Master of the Mews (Obriststallmeister)
 Court's Fourriers
 The Grand Master of the Hunt (Obristjägermeister)
 The Superintendent of the Court's Music

Russia

Spain

Sweden

United Kingdom

Vatican

Asia

China

Japan
In Japan, the Imperial Household Agency (宮内庁, Kunaichō) is the agency within the Government of Japan responsible for supporting the Emperor and the Imperial Family as well as keeping the Privy Seal and Great Seal of Japan. 

The Agency is headed by a director-general, who is assisted by the Cabinet-appointed deputy director. The internal organisation of the Agency can be seen below.

 The Grand Steward's Secretariat
 Board of Chamberlains
 Emperor Emeritus' Household
 Crown Prince's Household
 Board of Ceremonies
 Archives and Mausolea Department
 Maintenance and Works Department

Auxiliary organs of the Agency include:

 Office of the Shoshoin Treasure House
 Imperial Stock Farm

Local branch office:

 Kyoto Office

Thailand

See also 
 Medieval household

References

External links 
 The British Monarchy - Royal Household